

Events

Pre-1600
33 – According to one historian's account, Jesus Christ's Last Supper is held.
 527 – Byzantine Emperor Justin I names his nephew Justinian I as co-ruler and successor to the throne.
1081 – Alexios I Komnenos overthrows the Byzantine emperor Nikephoros III Botaneiates, and, after his troops spend three days extensively looting Constantinople, is formally crowned on April 4.
1572 – In the Eighty Years' War, the Watergeuzen capture Brielle from the Seventeen Provinces, gaining the first foothold on land for what would become the Dutch Republic.

1601–1900
1789 – In New York City, the United States House of Representatives achieves its first quorum and elects Frederick Muhlenberg of Pennsylvania as its first Speaker.
1833 – The Convention of 1833, a political gathering of settlers in Mexican Texas to help draft a series of petitions to the Mexican government, begins in San Felipe de Austin.
1865 – American Civil War: Union troops led by Philip Sheridan decisively defeat Confederate troops led by George Pickett, cutting the Army of Northern Virginia's last supply line.
1867 – Singapore becomes a British crown colony.
1873 – The White Star steamer SS Atlantic sinks off Nova Scotia, killing 547 in one of the worst marine disasters of the 19th century.
1900 – Prince George becomes absolute monarch of the Cretan State.

1901–present
1908 – The Territorial Force (renamed Territorial Army in 1920) is formed as a volunteer reserve component of the British Army.
1918 – The Royal Air Force is created by the merger of the Royal Flying Corps and the Royal Naval Air Service.
1924 – Adolf Hitler is sentenced to five years imprisonment for his participation in the "Beer Hall Putsch" but spends only nine months in jail.
  1924   – The Royal Canadian Air Force is formed.
1933 – The recently elected Nazis under Julius Streicher organize a one-day boycott of all Jewish-owned businesses in Germany, ushering in a series of anti-Semitic acts.
1935 – India's central banking institution, the Reserve Bank of India, is formed.
1937 – Aden becomes a British crown colony.
  1937   – The Royal New Zealand Air Force is formed as an independent service.
1939 – Spanish Civil War: Generalísimo Francisco Franco of the Spanish State announces the end of the Spanish Civil War, when the last of the Republican forces surrender.
1941 – Fântâna Albă massacre: Between 200 and 2,000 Romanian civilians are killed by Soviet Border Troops.
  1941   – A military coup in Iraq overthrows the regime of 'Abd al-Ilah and installs Rashid Ali al-Gaylani as Prime Minister.
1944 – World War II: Navigation errors lead to an accidental American bombing of the Swiss city of Schaffhausen.
1945 – World War II: The Tenth United States Army attacks the Thirty-Second Japanese Army on Okinawa.
1946 – The 8.6  Aleutian Islands earthquake shakes the Aleutian Islands with a maximum Mercalli intensity of VI (Strong). A destructive tsunami reaches the Hawaiian Islands resulting in dozens of deaths, mostly in Hilo, Hawaii.
  1946   – The Malayan Union is established. Protests from locals led to the establishment of the Federation of Malaya two years later.
1947 – The only mutiny in the history of the Royal New Zealand Navy begins.
1948 – Cold War: Communist forces respond to the introduction of the Deutsche Mark by attempting to force the western powers to withdraw from Berlin.
  1948   – Faroe Islands gain autonomy from Denmark.
1949 – Chinese Civil War: The Chinese Communist Party holds unsuccessful peace talks with the Nationalist Party in Beijing, after three years of fighting.
  1949   – The Government of Canada repeals Japanese-Canadian internment after seven years.
1954 – United States President Dwight D. Eisenhower authorizes the creation of the United States Air Force Academy in Colorado Springs, Colorado.
1955 – The EOKA rebellion against the British Empire begins in Cyprus, with the goal of unifying with Greece.
1960 – The TIROS-1 satellite transmits the first television picture from space.
1964 – The British Admiralty, War Office and Air Ministry are replaced by a unified Defence Council of the United Kingdom.
1969 – The Hawker Siddeley Harrier, the first operational fighter aircraft with Vertical/Short Takeoff and Landing capabilities, enters service with the Royal Air Force.
1970 – President Richard Nixon signs the Public Health Cigarette Smoking Act into law.
1971 – Bangladesh Liberation War: The Pakistan Army massacre over 1,000 people in Keraniganj Upazila, Bangladesh.
1973 – Project Tiger, a tiger conservation project, is launched in the Jim Corbett National Park, India.
1974 – The Local Government Act 1972 of England and Wales comes into effect.
1976 – Steve Jobs and Steve Wozniak found Apple Computer, Inc. 
1979 – Iran becomes an Islamic republic by a 99% vote, officially overthrowing the Shah.
1984 – Singer Marvin Gaye is shot to death by his father in his home in Arlington Heights, Los Angeles, California.
1986 – Communist Party of Nepal (Mashal) cadres attack a number of police stations in Kathmandu, seeking to incite a popular rebellion.
1989 – Margaret Thatcher's new local government tax, the Community Charge (commonly known as the "poll tax"), is introduced in Scotland.
1997 – Comet Hale–Bopp is seen passing at perihelion.
1999 – Nunavut is established as a Canadian territory carved out of the eastern part of the Northwest Territories.
2001 – An EP-3E United States Navy surveillance aircraft collides with a Chinese People's Liberation Army Shenyang J-8 fighter jet. The Chinese pilot ejected but is subsequently lost. The Navy crew makes an emergency landing in Hainan, China and is detained.
  2001   – Former President of Federal Republic of Yugoslavia Slobodan Milošević surrenders to police special forces, to be tried on war crimes charges.
  2001   – Same-sex marriage becomes legal in the Netherlands, the first contemporary country to allow it.
2004 – Google launches its Email service Gmail.
2006 – Serious Organised Crime Agency (SOCA) of the Government of the United Kingdom is enforced, but later merged into National Crime Agency on 7 October 2013.
2011 – After protests against the burning of the Quran turn violent, a mob attacks a United Nations compound in Mazar-i-Sharif, Afghanistan, resulting in the deaths of thirteen people, including eight foreign workers.
2016 – The 2016 Nagorno-Karabakh conflict begins along the Nagorno-Karabakh Line of Contact.

Births

Pre-1600
1220 – Emperor Go-Saga of Japan (d. 1272)
1282 – Louis IV, Holy Roman Emperor (d. 1347)
1328 – Blanche of France, Duchess of Orléans (d. 1382)
1543 – François de Bonne, Duke of Lesdiguières (d. 1626)
1578 – William Harvey, English physician and academic (d. 1657)

1601–1900
1610 – Charles de Saint-Évremond, French soldier and critic (d. 1703)
1629 – Jean-Henri d'Anglebert, French organist and composer (d. 1691)
1640 – Georg Mohr, Danish mathematician and academic (d. 1697)
1647 – John Wilmot, 2nd Earl of Rochester, English poet and courtier (d. 1680)
1697 – Antoine François Prévost, French novelist and translator (d. 1763)
1721 – Pieter Hellendaal, Dutch-English organist, violinist, and composer (d. 1799)
1741 – George Dance the Younger, English architect and surveyor (d. 1825)
1753 – Joseph de Maistre, French philosopher, lawyer, and diplomat (d. 1821)
1755 – Jean Anthelme Brillat-Savarin, French lawyer and politician (d. 1826)
1765 – Luigi Schiavonetti, Italian engraver and etcher (d. 1810)
1776 – Sophie Germain, French mathematician, physicist, and philosopher (d. 1831)
1786 – William Mulready, Irish genre painter (d. 1863)
1815 – Otto von Bismarck, German lawyer and politician, 1st Chancellor of the German Empire (d. 1898)
  1815   – Edward Clark, American lawyer and politician, 8th Governor of Texas (d. 1880)
1823 – Simon Bolivar Buckner, American general and politician, 30th Governor of Kentucky (d. 1891)
1824 – Louis-Zéphirin Moreau, Canadian bishop (d. 1901)
1834 – James Fisk, American businessman (d. 1872)
1852 – Edwin Austin Abbey, American painter and illustrator (d. 1911)
1865 – Richard Adolf Zsigmondy, Austrian-German chemist and academic, Nobel Prize laureate (d. 1929)
1866 – William Blomfield, New Zealand cartoonist and politician (d. 1938)
  1866   – Ferruccio Busoni, Italian pianist, composer, and conductor (d. 1924)
  1866   – Ève Lavallière, French actress (d. 1929)
1868 – Edmond Rostand, French poet and playwright (d. 1918)
  1868   – Walter Mead, English cricketer (d. 1954)
1871 – F. Melius Christiansen, Norwegian-American violinist and conductor (d. 1955)
1873 – Sergei Rachmaninoff, Russian pianist, composer, and conductor (d. 1943)
1874 – Ernest Barnes, English mathematician and theologian (d. 1953)
  1874   – Prince Karl of Bavaria (d. 1927)
1875 – Edgar Wallace, English journalist, author, and playwright (d. 1932)
1878 – C. Ganesha Iyer, Ceylon Tamil philologist (d. 1958)
1879 – Stanislaus Zbyszko, Polish wrestler and strongman (d. 1967)
1881 – Octavian Goga, Romanian Prime Minister (d. 1938)
1883 – Lon Chaney, American actor, director, and screenwriter (d. 1930)
  1883   – Edvard Drabløs, Norwegian actor and director (d. 1976) 
  1883   – Laurette Taylor, Irish-American actress (d. 1946)
1885 – Wallace Beery, American actor (d. 1949)
  1885   – Clementine Churchill, English wife of Winston Churchill (d. 1977)
1889 – K. B. Hedgewar, Indian physician and activist (d. 1940)
1893 – Cicely Courtneidge, Australian-English actress (d. 1980)
1895 – Alberta Hunter, African-American singer-songwriter and nurse (d. 1984)
1898 – William James Sidis, Ukrainian-Russian Jewish American mathematician, anthropologist, and historian (d. 1944)
1899 – Gustavs Celmiņš, Latvian academic and politician (d. 1968)
1900 – Stefanie Clausen, Danish Olympic diver (d. 1981)

1901–present
1901 – Whittaker Chambers, American journalist and spy (d. 1961)
1902 – Maria Polydouri, Greek poet (d. 1930) 
1905 – Gaston Eyskens, Belgian economist and politician, 47th Prime Minister of Belgium (d. 1988)
  1905   – Paul Hasluck, Australian historian, poet, and politician, 17th Governor-General of Australia (d. 1993)
1906 – Alexander Sergeyevich Yakovlev, Russian engineer, founded the Yakovlev Design Bureau (d. 1989)
1907 – Shivakumara Swami, Indian religious leader and philanthropist (d. 2019)
1908 – Abraham Maslow, American psychologist and academic (d. 1970)
  1908   – Harlow Rothert, American shot putter, lawyer, and academic (d. 1997)
1909 – Abner Biberman, American actor, director, and screenwriter (d. 1977)
  1909   – Eddy Duchin, American pianist and bandleader (d. 1951)
1910 – Harry Carney, American saxophonist and clarinet player (d. 1974)
  1910   – Bob Van Osdel, American high jumper and soldier (d. 1987)
1911 – Augusta Braxton Baker, African American librarian (d. 1998)
1913 – Memos Makris, Greek sculptor (d. 1993)
1915 – O. W. Fischer, Austrian-Swiss actor and director (d. 2004)
1916 – Sheila May Edmonds, British mathematician (d. 2002)
1917 – Sydney Newman, Canadian screenwriter and producer, co-created Doctor Who (d. 1997)
  1917   – Melville Shavelson, American director, producer, and screenwriter (d. 2007)
1919 – Joseph Murray, American surgeon and soldier, Nobel Prize laureate (d. 2012)
1920 – Toshiro Mifune, Japanese actor (d. 1997)
1921 – William Bergsma, American composer and educator (d. 1994)
  1921   – Arthur "Guitar Boogie" Smith, American guitarist, fiddler, and composer (d. 2014)
1922 – Duke Jordan, American pianist and composer (d. 2006)
  1922   – William Manchester, American historian and author (d. 2004)
1924 – Brendan Byrne, American lieutenant, judge, and politician, 47th Governor of New Jersey (d. 2018)
1926 – Anne McCaffrey, American-Irish author (d. 2011)
1927 – Walter Bahr, American soccer player, coach, and manager (d. 2018)
  1927   – Amos Milburn, American R&B singer-songwriter and pianist (d. 1980)
  1927   – Ferenc Puskás, Hungarian footballer and manager (d. 2006)
1929 – Jonathan Haze, American actor, producer, screenwriter, and production manager
  1929   – Milan Kundera, Czech-born novelist, poet, and playwright
  1929   – Payut Ngaokrachang, Thai animator and director (d. 2010)
  1929   – Jane Powell, American actress, singer, and dancer (d. 2021)
1930 – Grace Lee Whitney, American actress and singer (d. 2015)
1931 – George Baker, Bulgarian-English actor and screenwriter (d. 2011)
  1931   – Rolf Hochhuth, German author and playwright (d. 2020)
1932 – Debbie Reynolds, American actress, singer, and dancer (d. 2016)
1933 – Claude Cohen-Tannoudji, Algerian-French physicist and academic, Nobel Prize laureate
  1933   – Dan Flavin, American sculptor and educator (d. 1996)
  1933   – Bengt Holbek, Danish folklorist (d. 1992)
1934 – Vladimir Posner, French-American journalist and radio host
1935 – Larry McDonald, American physician and politician (d. 1983)
1936 – Peter Collinson, English-American director and producer (d. 1980)
  1936   – Jean-Pascal Delamuraz, Swiss politician, 80th President of the Swiss Confederation (d. 1998)
  1936   – Tarun Gogoi, Indian politician, 14th Chief Minister of Assam (d. 2020)
  1936   – Abdul Qadeer Khan, Indian-Pakistani physicist, chemist, and engineer (d. 2021)
1939 – Ali MacGraw, American model and actress
  1939   – Phil Niekro, American baseball player and manager (d. 2020)
1940 – Wangari Maathai, Kenyan environmentalist and politician, Nobel Prize laureate (d. 2011)
1941 – Gideon Gadot, Israeli journalist and politician (d. 2012)
  1941   – Ajit Wadekar, Indian cricketer, coach, and manager (d. 2018)
1942 – Samuel R. Delany, American author and critic
  1942   – Richard D. Wolff, American economist and academic
1943 – Dafydd Wigley, Welsh academic and politician
1946 – Nikitas Kaklamanis, Greek academic and politician, Greek Minister of Health and Social Security
  1946   – Ronnie Lane, English bass player, songwriter, and producer (d. 1997)
  1946   – Arrigo Sacchi, Italian footballer, coach, and manager
1947 – Alain Connes, French mathematician and academic
  1948   – Javier Irureta, Spanish footballer and manager
  1948   – Peter Law, Welsh politician and independent Member of Parliament (d. 2006)
1949 – Gérard Mestrallet, French businessman
  1949   – Paul Manafort, American lobbyist, political consultant, and convicted felon
  1949   – Sammy Nelson, Northern Irish footballer and coach
  1949   – Gil Scott-Heron, American singer-songwriter and author (d. 2011)
1950 – Samuel Alito, American lawyer and jurist, Associate Justice of the Supreme Court of the United States
  1950   – Loris Kessel, Swiss racing driver (d. 2010)
  1950   – Daniel Paillé, Canadian academic and politician
1951 – John Abizaid, American general
1952 – Annette O'Toole, American actress 
  1952   – Bernard Stiegler, French philosopher and academic (d. 2020)
1953 – Barry Sonnenfeld, American cinematographer, director, and producer
  1953   – Alberto Zaccheroni, Italian footballer and manager
1954 – Jeff Porcaro, American drummer, songwriter, and producer (d. 1992)
1955 – Don Hasselbeck, American football player and sportscaster
  1955   – Humayun Akhtar Khan, Pakistani politician, 5th Commerce Minister of Pakistan
1957 – David Gower, English cricketer and sportscaster 
  1957   – Denise Nickerson, American actress (d. 2019)
1958 – D. Boon, American singer and musician (d. 1985)
1959 – Helmuth Duckadam, Romanian footballer
1961 – Susan Boyle, Scottish singer 
  1961   – Sergio Scariolo, Italian professional basketball head coach
  1961   – Mark White, English singer-songwriter and guitarist 
  1962   – Mark Shulman, American author
1962 – Chris Grayling, English journalist and politician, Lord High Chancellor of Great Britain
  1962   – Samboy Lim, Filipino basketball player and manager
  1962   – Phillip Schofield, English television host
1963 – Teodoro de Villa Diaz, Filipino guitarist and songwriter (d. 1988)
  1963   – Aprille Ericsson-Jackson, American aerospace engineer
1964 – Erik Breukink, Dutch cyclist and manager
  1964   – Kevin Duckworth, American basketball player (d. 2008)
  1964   – John Morris, English cricketer
  1964   – José Rodrigues dos Santos, Portuguese journalist, author, and educator
1965 – Jane Adams, American film, television, and stage actress
  1965   – Mark Jackson, American basketball player and coach
1966 – Chris Evans, English radio and television host
  1966   – Mehmet Özdilek, Turkish footballer and manager
1967 – Nicola Roxon, Australian lawyer and politician, 34th Attorney-General for Australia
1968 – Mike Baird, Australian politician, 44th Premier of New South Wales
  1968   – Andreas Schnaas, German actor and director
  1968   – Alexander Stubb, Finnish academic and politician, 43rd Prime Minister of Finland
1969 – Lev Lobodin, Ukrainian-Russian decathlete
  1969   – Andrew Vlahov, Australian basketball player 
  1969   – Dean Windass, English footballer and manager
1970 – Brad Meltzer, American author, screenwriter, and producer
1971 – Sonia Bisset, Cuban javelin thrower
  1971   – Shinji Nakano, Japanese racing driver
1972 – Darren McCarty, Canadian ice hockey player and sportscaster
  1972   – Jesse Tobias, American guitarist and songwriter 
1973 – Christian Finnegan, American comedian and actor
  1973   – Stephen Fleming, New Zealand cricketer and coach
  1973   – Rachel Maddow, American journalist and author
1974 – Hugo Ibarra, Argentinian footballer and manager
1975 – John Butler, American-Australian singer-songwriter and producer 
  1975   – Magdalena Maleeva, Bulgarian tennis player
1976 – Hazem El Masri, Lebanese-Australian rugby league player and educator
  1976   – David Gilliland, American race car driver
  1976   – David Oyelowo, English actor 
  1976   – Clarence Seedorf, Dutch-Brazilian footballer and manager
  1976   – Yuka Yoshida, Japanese tennis player
1977 – Vitor Belfort, Brazilian-American boxer and mixed martial artist
  1977   – Haimar Zubeldia, Spanish cyclist
1978 – Antonio de Nigris, Mexican footballer (d. 2009)
  1978   – Mirka Federer, Slovak-Swiss tennis player
  1978   – Anamaria Marinca, Romanian-English actress
  1978   – Etan Thomas, American basketball player
1979 – Ruth Beitia, Spanish high jumper
1980 – Dennis Kruppke, German footballer
  1980   – Randy Orton, American wrestler 
  1980   – Bijou Phillips, American actress and model
1981 – Antonis Fotsis, Greek basketball player
  1981   – Bjørn Einar Romøren, Norwegian ski jumper
1982 – Taran Killam, American actor, voice artist, comedian, and writer
  1982   – Andreas Thorkildsen, Norwegian javelin thrower
1983 – Ólafur Ingi Skúlason, Icelandic footballer
  1983   – Sean Taylor, American football player (d. 2007)
1984 – Gilberto Macena, Brazilian footballer
1985 – Daniel Murphy, American baseball player
  1985   – Beth Tweddle, English gymnast
1986 – Nikolaos Kourtidis, Greek weightlifter 
  1986   – Hillary Scott, American country singer-songwriter 
1987 – Ding Junhui, Chinese professional snooker player
  1987   – Gianluca Musacci, Italian footballer
  1987   – Oliver Turvey, English racing driver
1988 – Brook Lopez, American basketball player
  1988   – Robin Lopez, American basketball player
1989 – Jan Blokhuijsen, Dutch speed skater
  1989   – David N'Gog, French footballer
  1989   – Christian Vietoris, German racing driver
1990 – Julia Fischer, German discus thrower
1992 – Deng Linlin, Chinese gymnast
1995 – Logan Paul, American Youtuber, actor and wrestler
1997 – Asa Butterfield, English actor
  1997   – Álex Palou, Spanish racing driver

Deaths

Pre-1600
 996 – John XV, pope of the Catholic Church
1085 – Shen Zong, Chinese emperor (b. 1048)
1132 – Hugh of Châteauneuf, French bishop (b. 1053)
1204 – Eleanor of Aquitaine, queen of France and England (b. 1122)
1205 – Amalric II, king of Cyprus and Jerusalem
1282 – Abaqa Khan, ruler of the Mongol Ilkhanate (b. 1234)
1431 – Nuno Álvares Pereira, Portuguese general (b. 1360)
1441 – Blanche I, queen of Navarre and Sicily (b. 1387)
1455 – Zbigniew Oleśnicki, Polish cardinal and statesman (b. 1389)
1528 – Francisco de Peñalosa, Spanish composer (b. 1470)
1548 – Sigismund I, king of Poland (b. 1467)
1580 – Alonso Mudarra, Spanish guitarist and composer (b. 1510)

1601–1900
1621 – Cristofano Allori, Italian painter and educator (b. 1577)
1682 – Franz Egon of Fürstenberg, Bavarian bishop (b. 1625)
1787 – Floyer Sydenham, English scholar and academic (b. 1710)
1839 – Benjamin Pierce, American soldier and politician, 11th Governor of New Hampshire (b. 1757)
1865 – Antonios Kriezis, Greek Navy officer and Prime Minister of Greece (b. 1796) 
  1865   – Giuditta Pasta, Italian soprano (b. 1797)
1872 – Frederick Denison Maurice, English theologian and academic (b. 1805)
1878 – John C.W. Daly, English-Canadian soldier and politician (b. 1796)
1890 – David Wilber, American politician (b. 1820)
  1890   – Alexander Mozhaysky, Russian soldier, pilot, and engineer (b. 1825)

1901–present
1914 – Rube Waddell, American baseball player (b. 1876)
  1914   – Charles Wells, English founder of Charles Wells Ltd (b. 1842)
1917 – Scott Joplin, American pianist and composer (b. 1868)
1920 – Walter Simon, German banker and philanthropist (b. 1857)
1922 – Charles I, emperor of Austria (b. 1887)
1924 – Jacob Bolotin, American physician (b. 1888)
1924 – Lloyd Hildebrand, English cyclist (b. 1870)
  1924   – Stan Rowley, Australian sprinter (b. 1876)
1946 – Noah Beery, Sr., American actor (b. 1882)
1947 – George II, king of Greece (b. 1890)
1950 – Charles R. Drew, American physician and surgeon (b. 1904)
  1950   – Recep Peker, Turkish soldier and politician, 6th Prime Minister of Turkey (b. 1889)
1962 – Jussi Kekkonen, Finnish captain and businessman (b. 1910)
1965 – Helena Rubinstein, Polish-American businesswoman (b. 1870)
1966 – Brian O'Nolan, Irish author (b. 1911)
1968 – Lev Landau, Azerbaijani-Russian physicist and academic, Nobel Prize laureate (b. 1908)
1971 – Kathleen Lonsdale, Irish crystallographer and prison reformer (b. 1903)
1976 – Max Ernst, German painter and sculptor (b. 1891)
1981 – Eua Sunthornsanan, Thai singer-songwriter and bandleader (b. 1910)
1984 – Marvin Gaye, American singer-songwriter (b. 1939)
  1984   – Elizabeth Goudge, English author (b. 1900)
1986 – Erik Bruhn, Danish actor, director, and choreographer (b. 1928)
  1986   – Edwin Boston, English clergyman, author, and railway preservationist
1987 – Henri Cochet, French tennis player (b. 1901)
1991 – Martha Graham, American dancer and choreographer (b. 1894)
  1991   – Jaime Guzmán, Chilean lawyer and politician (b. 1946)
1992 – Michael Havers, Baron Havers, English lawyer and politician, Lord High Chancellor of Great Britain (b. 1923)
1993 – Alan Kulwicki, American race car driver (b. 1954)
1994 – Robert Doisneau, French photographer (b. 1912)
1995 – H. Adams Carter, American mountaineer, journalist, and educator (b. 1914)
  1995   – Francisco Moncion, Dominican American ballet dancer, choreographer, charter member of the New York City Ballet (b. 1918)
  1995   – Lucie Rie, Austrian-English potter (b. 1902)
1997 – Makar Honcharenko, Ukrainian footballer and manager (b. 1912)
1998 – Rozz Williams, American singer-songwriter and guitarist (b. 1963)
1999 – Jesse Stone, American pianist, songwriter, and producer (b. 1901)
2001 – Trịnh Công Sơn, Vietnamese guitarist and composer (b. 1939)
2002 – Simo Häyhä, Finnish soldier and sniper (b. 1905)
2003 – Leslie Cheung, Hong Kong singer-songwriter and actor (b. 1956)
2004 – Ioannis Kyrastas, Greek footballer and manager (b. 1952)
  2004   – Carrie Snodgress, American actress (b. 1945)
2005 – Paul Bomani, Tanzanian politician and diplomat, 1st Tanzanian Minister of Finance (b 1925)
  2005   – Robert Coldwell Wood, American political scientist and academic (b. 1923)
2006 – In Tam, Cambodian general and politician, 26th Prime Minister of Cambodia (b. 1916)
2010 – John Forsythe, American actor (b. 1918)
  2010   – Tzannis Tzannetakis, Greek soldier and politician, 175th Prime Minister of Greece (b. 1927)
2012 – Lionel Bowen, Australian soldier, lawyer, and politician, Deputy Prime Minister of Australia (b. 1922)
  2012   – Giorgio Chinaglia, Italian-American soccer player and radio host (b. 1947)
  2012   – Miguel de la Madrid, Mexican banker, academic, and politician, 52nd President of Mexico (b. 1934)
2013 – Moses Blah, Liberian general and politician, 23rd President of Liberia (b. 1947)
  2013  – Karen Muir, South African swimmer and physician (b. 1952)
2014 – King Fleming, American pianist and bandleader (b. 1922)
  2014   – Jacques Le Goff, French historian and author (b. 1924)
  2014  – Rolf Rendtorff, German theologian and academic (b. 1925)
2015 – Nicolae Rainea, Romanian footballer and referee (b. 1933)
2017 – Lonnie Brooks, American blues singer and guitarist (b. 1933)
  2017 – Yevgeny Yevtushenko, Soviet and Russian poet and writer (b. 1932)
2018 – Steven Bochco, American television writer and producer (b. 1943)
2019 – Vonda N. McIntyre, American science fiction author (b. 1948)

Holidays and observances
Christian feast day:
Cellach of Armagh
Hugh of Grenoble
Frederick Denison Maurice (Church of England)
Mary of Egypt
Melito of Sardis
Tewdrig
Theodora
Walric, abbot of Leuconay
April 1 (Eastern Orthodox liturgics)
April Fools' Day
Odisha Day (Odisha, India)
Arbor Day (Tanzania)
Civil Service Day (Thailand)
Cyprus National Day (Cyprus) 
Edible Book Day
Fossil Fools Day
Kha b-Nisan, the Assyrian New Year (Assyrian people)

References

External links

 BBC: On This Day
 
 Historical Events on April 1

Days of the year
April